Phlyctenodes is a genus of crabs in the family Xanthidae, containing the following fossil species:

 Phlyctenodes dalpaizi Fabiani, 1911
 Phlyctenodes krenneri Lorenthey, 1898
 Phlyctenodes nicolisi Bittner, 1884
 Phlyctenodes pustulosus A. Milne-Edwards, 1862
 Phlyctenodes steinmanni Lorenthey, 1902
 Phlyctenodes tuberculosus A. Milne-Edwards, 1862

References

Xanthoidea